Khasanovo (Xäsän) is a rural locality (a village) in Tatlybayevsky Selsoviet, Baymaksky District, Bashkortostan, Russia. The population was 57 as of 2010. There are 6 streets.

Geography 
Khasanovo is located 25 km northeast of Baymak (the district's administrative centre) by road. Yanzigitovo is the nearest rural locality.

References 

Rural localities in Baymaksky District